Italy has participated in all 17 editions of the FINA World Aquatics Championships, held since the first edition of 1973 World Aquatics Championships, winning 154 podiums, including 46 world titles, 54 silver medals and 63 bronze medals.

Medals by disciplines
Are excluded open water swimming stand alone championships (6 editions).

Diving

From 2013 including two high diving competiopns.

Open water swimming

Swimming
All Italian medals till Budapest 2022.

Synchronized swimming

Water polo

See also
 Italy national swimming team
 Italy national diving team
 Italy at the European Aquatics Championships
 Swimming World Championships medal table

References

External links
 Official site of the Italian Swimming Federation  

 
Nations at the World Aquatics Championships
World Aquatics Championships
World Aquatics Championships